László Orczán (5 February 1912 – 17 March 1992) was a Hungarian cyclist. He competed in the 1000m time trial and team pursuit events at the 1936 Summer Olympics.

References

External links
 

1912 births
1992 deaths
Hungarian male cyclists
Olympic cyclists of Hungary
Cyclists at the 1936 Summer Olympics
Cyclists from Budapest
Hungarian male speed skaters